The Attenborough Arts Centre is an arts centre on Lancaster Road, Leicester, United Kingdom. It is the University of Leicester arts centre but also serves Leicester as a whole. The centre's access and inclusive work has been recognised, through multiple awards and grants from Arts Council England, BBC Children in Need, LeicesterShire Promotions, Art Fund and Paul Hamlyn Foundation.

History 

The centre is inspired by the work of filmmaker, actor and patron of the arts Richard Attenborough. It was opened in 1997 by Diana, Princess of Wales, after six years of funding efforts from Attenborough, just three months before her death.

With an increase in attendances and a greater demand for a gallery space in Leicester, in 2012 plans were announced for a new 300 square meters of exhibition space to be built on the east side of the building. On 17 November 2015, Sir Peter Bazalgette and Michael Attenborough opened the Attenborough Arts Centre's new £1.5 million art gallery, one of the largest contemporary art galleries in the region. The building was funded by over 1,000 public donations, Arts Council England and the University of Leicester.

In March 2020 the building was forced to closed during the COVID-19 pandemic and many of the creative courses, performances and events were cancelled. Despite the pandemic, many of courses were able to continue, notably their student-orientated Wildcard Wednesday and History of Art classes. For the international students who were unable to go back to their home countries during the pandemic, the weekly art boxes were received well and were "a relief from the stresses of [the pandemic]." The Attenborough Arts Centre was one of 1,385 cultural and creative organisations across the country to receive emergency financial support from Department of Media Culture and Sport. This was announced as part of the very first round of the Culture Recovery Fund grants programme being administered by Arts Council England. In March 2021 they announced they had received further support as part of phase two.

Facilities 

It hosts a gallery space, creative learning courses and a programme of in-house performances. The programme offers performance, courses and workshops, contemporary art exhibitions, and activities for children and families. The centre's gallery shows contemporary art. Opened in 2015, this extension doubled the size of the existing building as part of a £1.5 million capital project.

In 2021 Gallery 3 was opened, an interactive art space, designed to allow a greater access to the arts. Specifically designed for families and special needs education, it has interactive activities, a large TV screen and iPads on which people can see the work done through the centre's Next Gen. and education programmes.

The main performance space, the Diana Princess of Wales Hall, has a built-in light rigs, induction loop, and movable raised seating. The versatile nature of the space has allowed it to host activities ranging from shows as part of the Leicester Comedy Festival to Wrestling.

Selected exhibitions 

Art, Life, Activism: Contemporary art and the politics of disability (September, 2015) – Tony Heaton, Noemi Lakmaier, Aaron Williamson, Bobby Baker, and photographer David Hevey
Lucy + Jorge Ortega (January – April, 2016) – Lucy Ortega and Jorge Ortega
Plant Culture (July – September, 2016) – Gilbert & George, Marc Quinn, Anya Gallaccio, Andy Goldsworthy, Janice Kerbel, Georgie Hopton, Simon Starling, Michael Landy, Hayley Newman, John Newling, Lois Weinberg and John Stezaker, Annie
Uniforms (September – December, 2017) – Laura Swanson
Ebb and Flow (January – March 2018) – Steffie Richards
Altered Landscapes (January – February 2018) – Juan delGado
Criminal Ornamentation (September – December, 2018) – Yinka Shonibare
In My Shoes (March – September, 2019) – Rachel Maclean, Bedwyr Williams, and others 
Chainmail 2 (April – June, 2018) – Amartey Golding
In Out There (April – June, 2018) – Adam Reynolds, Sarah Carpenter, Nicola Lane, Terrence Birch, and Catherine Cleary
Awkward Beauty (July – October, 2019) – Lucy Jones
Inspiration Archives (May – July, 2019) – Aaron Williamson 
Let it be felt that the painter was there (November 2019 – February 2020) – Sargy Mann
Reasonable Adjustment (March 2020) – Justin Edgar
Mariner 9 (March – November 2020 – Kelly Richardson
Considering Silesia (June – December 2021) – Mik Godley
The World is a Work in Progress (September 2021 – January 2022) – Ruth Beale, Michael Forbes, Khush Kali, Vince Laws, Bob & Roberta Smith, Kai Syng Tan, and Jessica Voorsanger. 
Cosmic Garden (September – November 2021) – Yambe Tam

References

External links

Leicestershire County Council Page
Disability Arts Online

Leicester
Arts centres in England